Jason Lee may refer to:

Entertainment
Jason Lee (actor) (born 1970), American film and TV actor and former professional skateboarder
Jason Scott Lee (born 1966), Asian American film actor
Jaxon Lee (Jason Christopher Lee, born 1968), American voice-actor and co-founder of Gaijin Productions

Sports
Jason Lee (field hockey) (born 1970), English field hockey player and coach
Jason Lee (footballer) (born 1971), English footballer and football manager
Jason Lee (rugby league) (born 1971), of the 1990s and 2000s for Wales, Warrington Wolves, Keighley, and Halifax

Other
Jason Lee (missionary) (1803–1845), American missionary and pioneer in the Oregon Territory
Jason Lee (judge) (1915–1980), American judge and politician in Oregon
Jason Lee (Proctor), a 1953 outdoor bronze sculpture

Lee, Jason